"More & More" is a song by American recording artist Joe. It was written and produced by R. Kelly for Joe's fifth studio album And Then... (2003). Picked as the album's lead single, the contemporary R&B ballad was released in September 2003 in the United States and reached number 15 on Billboards Hot R&B/Hip-Hop Songs chart. Outside the US, "More & More" was released on a double A-single along with "Ride wit U", which served as the album's first international single.

Critical reception
In their review of And Then..., Vibe called the song "absolutely ravishing. 'More & More' is a languidly erotic blend of lubricious come-ons."

Track listing
Digital download
"More & More" – 3:46

Charts
All non-US entries charted with "Ride wit U".

Weekly charts

Year-end charts

Release history

References

2003 singles
2003 songs
Jive Records singles
Joe (singer) songs
Song recordings produced by R. Kelly
Songs written by R. Kelly